Limhamns IP is a football stadium in Limhamn, Malmö, Sweden. It is the home stadium of IF Limhamn Bunkeflo and Limhamns FF. When game regulations require the use of electric lights, Malmö IP is used instead.

Clubs
 IF Limhamn Bunkeflo 2008–present
 Limhamns FF 2010–present

Football venues in Sweden
IF Limhamn Bunkeflo
Sports venues in Malmö